Holmquist is an unincorporated community in Day County, in the U.S. state of South Dakota.

History
A post office called Holmquist was established in 1898, and remained in operation until 1963. The community has the name of Peter Holmquist, an early homesteader.

References

Unincorporated communities in Day County, South Dakota
Unincorporated communities in South Dakota